The United Nations Security Council (UNSC) is the organ of the United Nations charged with maintaining peace and security among nations. While other organs of the United Nations only make recommendations to member governments, the Security Council has the power to make decisions; which member governments must carry out if they fall under Chapter VII of the under the United Nations Charter. The decisions of the Council are known as United Nations Security Council Resolutions.

A UN member State, is obligated to respect the United Nations Charter and UN members are bound by its articles. Cyprus claims that Turkey violates the charter against Republic of Cyprus. Turkey does not recognize the continued existence of the Republic of Cyprus, as established by the London and Zurich Agreements Turkey refers to the Republic of Cyprus as the "Greek Cypriot administration" or "South Cyprus". 

In 1974 Turkey invaded Cyprus, after a military coup staged by the Greek Junta against the lawfully elected Government of Cyprus under President Makarios. The Turkish army subsequently occupied ~38% of the territory of the island which to this day remains de facto divided with  "Turkish Republic of Northern Cyprus" (TRNC) proclaimed in 1983 following a UDI by the Turkish Cypriots. The "TRNC" is an illegal entity as per UN Security Council Resolutions UN Security Council Resolution 541 and UN Security Council Resolution 550 and is recognized only by Turkey. The latter has, subsequently, been  condemned by the European Court of Human Rights (ECHR) for human rights violations in Cyprus.

Cyprus related Resolutions

Resolutions adopted by the  General Assembly
2077 (XX) 1965
3212 (XXIX) 1974
3395 (XXX) 1975
31/12 1976
32/15 1977
33/15 1978
34/30 1979
37/253 1983

On Missing Persons
3450 (XXX) 1975
32/128 1977
33/172 1978
36/164 1981
37/181 1982

On Human Rights
4 (XXXI) 1975
4 (XXXII) 1976
17 (XXXIV) 1978
1987/50 1987

See also

 Turkish invasion of Cyprus
 Cyprus dispute
 Republic of Cyprus
 Cyprus refugees
 Annan Plan for Cyprus

References

External links
 UN documentation Centre

 
 
 
Cyp
Cyprus dispute
Cyprus peace process